Pimelea sericea is a species of shrub in the family Thymelaeaceae. It is native to Australia, specifically Tasmania. Their common name is mountain rice flower. Pimelea means fat and sericea means silk. The reason could be that Pimelea species usually have oily seeds and fleshy cotyledon. The sericea  came from the fact that they are covered with silky hair.

Rye (1990)  classified Pimelea into seven sections: Heterantheros, Pimelea, Epallage, Calyptrostegia, Macrostegia, Stipostachys, and Heterolaena. Pimelea sericea falls under Epallage. Characteristics of Epallage are hairy stems, plants are usually bisexual or gynodioecious, sessile bracts absent; stamens usually inserted below the base of sepals. Pimelea sericea have these characteristics and are explained more below.

Description

Flower 
The shrub grows from 0.3 to 0.8 m tall, with dense flowers. The flowers are pink or white and sometimes both colors which blooms from late spring to mid-summer (November to February). The inflorescences are dense, terminal, and compact which are bisexual and infrequently female. Their flower is composed of 3.5-4.5mm long style, 2-3mm long sepals, stamens that are slightly shorter than sepals which are inserted at the base of sepals and 5.5-7.5mm long hypanthium. The hypanthium is circumscissile and partly hairy inside but sepals are glabrous. The anther locules are semi-latrorse and style exerted.

Leaf 
It has opposite dark green leaves which are elliptic or broadly elliptic. The lamina are shortly petiolated; 3–9 mm long and 2–6 mm wide. On the adaxial surface, the leaves are dark color and glabrous (smooth without hair). In comparison, the lower half (abaxial) of its leaves are covered with white short dense hair. Moreover, their stems and outside of the flower (excluding the base) are also hairy.

Habit 
Pimelea sericea is endemic to Tasmania and seen in alpine, subalpine moorland areas. They are found in altitudes of 750-1400m such as Cradle mountain, Mount Barrow, and Mount Wellington.

Morphologically similar species 
Recently, a new Pimelea plant (Pimelia leiophylla) was found and it is morphologically, most similar to Pimelea sericea. Their morphological differences are leiophylla have silky-villous hairs on the adaxial leaf surface. Moreover, leaves are arranged in opposite-decussate. In contrast, serica leaves are glabrous on the adaxial surface and leaves are alternating and form spiral arrangements.  

Recently, a new Pimelea plant (Pimelia leiophylla) was found and it is morphologically, most similar to Pimelea sericea. Their morphological differences are leiophylla plants have silky-villous hairs on the adaxial leaf surface. Moreover, leaves are arranged in opposite-decussate. In contrast, serica leaves are glabrous on the adaxial surface and leaves are alternating and form spiral arrangements.  
 
Moreover, they have different habits. The leiophylla plants are found at Freycinet and it was considered too far to be distributed from North-east, Southern subalpine and mountains. The substrate is different as sericea usually grows on dolerate and it was found on Devonian granite substrate.

Phylogenetic relationship 
The genus Pimelia are spread around Australia and New Zealand. There are about 130 species and seven are endemic to Tasmania. The Pimelea plant has many different habitats which means that it has a complex biogeographic history.

The majority of Tasmanian species fall into the same clade and Pimelea sericea are included. When compared with other Epallage species, Pimelea sericea are more closely related to other Tasmanian species. The other Epallage species are monophyletic. The majority of Australian Epallage are located in Queensland and New South Wales. This indicates that Tasmanian species have a common ancestor and diversified over the years in Tasmania. Pimelea sericea evolved the Epallage characteristic individually in Tasmanian and different from other Epallage species in Australia.

References

sericea
Malvales of Australia